The Torneo Gran Alternativa (2014) was a professional wrestling tournament event produced by Consejo Mundial de Lucha Libre (CMLL) that took place from January 31 until February 14, 2014, over the course of two CMLL Super Viernes shows, with the finals on the Arena Mexico 57th Anniversary Show. The Torneo Gran Alternativa (Spanish for "the Great Alternative tournament) concept sees a Novato or rookie team up with an experienced wrestler for a tag team tournament. The rookie winner has often been elevated up the ranks of CMLL as a result of winning the tournament, but there is no specific "prize" for winning the tournament beyond a symbolic trophy. The tournament was won by rookie Cavernario and veteran Mr. Niebla, the success of the tournament led to Cavernario being added to Mr. Niebla's group La Peste Negra

Tournament background
The tournament featured 15 professional wrestling matches with different wrestlers teaming up, some of which may be involved in pre-existing scripted feuds or storylines while others are simply paired up for the tournament. Wrestlers portray either villains (referred to as Rudos in Mexico) or fan favorites (Técnicos in Mexico) as they compete in wrestling matches with pre-determined outcomes. The tournament format follows CMLL's traditional tournament formats, with two qualifying blocks of eight teams that compete on the first and second week of the tournament and a final match between the two block winners. The qualifying blocks were one-fall matches while the tournament finals will be a best two-out-of-three falls tag team match. Each qualifying block started with all 8 Novatos competing in a "seeding" battle royal to determine the brackets for the block. The team of Cavernario and Mr. Niebla defeated Soberano Jr. and Volador Jr. in the finals on February 14. Out of all the Novato participants seven of them had participated in the Gran Alternativa tournament before, primarily the 2013 tournament; Soberano Jr., Oro Jr., Guerrero Negro Jr., Herodes Jr., Espanto Jr., Akuma and Hombre Bala Jr.

2014 Gran Alternativa participants

Tournament results

References

2014 in professional wrestling
CMLL Torneo Gran Alternativa
January 2014 events in Mexico
February 2014 events in Mexico